This article contains information about the literary events and publications of 1742.

Events
February – Henry Fielding's picaresque novel Joseph Andrews appears in London as The History of the Adventures of Joseph Andrews and of his Friend Mr. Abraham Adams, written in imitation of the manner of Cervantes, author of Don Quixote. Described by Fielding as a "comic epic poem in prose", it is his first full-length novel and among the earliest in the English language. A second edition appears on June 10.
December 2 – The Pennsylvania Journal first appears in the United States.
December – The novelist and dramatist Pierre de Marivaux is elected to the Académie française.
unknown dates
The Irish portraitist Charles Jervas' English translation of Don Quixote is published three years after his death. Through a printer's error, the translator's name is printed as "Charles Jarvis", leading to the book being known forever as the "Jarvis" translation. It is acclaimed as the most faithful English rendering of the novel up to this time.
The Stockholm Gazette, founded by Peter Momma, begins publication.
The publisher Robert Foulis acquires his own printing press in Glasgow.
The French typefounder Pierre Simon Fournier's Modèles des Caractères presents his system of point sizes for typography.

New books

Fiction
Claude Prosper Jolyot de Crébillon – The Sofa: A Moral Tale (Le Sopha, conte moral)
Henry Fielding – Joseph Andrews
Eliza Haywood – The Virtuous Villager
Charles Jervas (translator) – Don Quixote

Drama
Charlotte Charke – Tit for Tat
Charles Jennens – libretto for Handel's oratorio the Messiah
José de Cañizares – El anillo de Giges
Ignacio de Luzán – La virtud coronada

Poetry

William Collins – Persian Eclogues
Thomas Cooke – Original Poems
James Hammond – Love Elegies
James Merrick – The Destruction of Troy
William Shenstone – The School-Mistress
William Somervile – Field Sports
Charles Hanbury Williams – The Country Girl: An ode
Edward Young – Night Thoughts

Non-fiction
Colley Cibber – A Letter from Mr. Cibber to Mr. Pope (in re Pope's satirizing of Cibber)
Ignacio de Luzán – Carta en defensa de España
Philip Doddridge – Evidences of Christianity
Pierre Simon Fournier – Modèles des Caractères
Nathaniel Hooke – An Account of the Conduct of the Dowager Duchess of Marlborough from her first coming to Court to the year 1710
Edmond Hoyle – A Short Treatise on the Game of Whist
David Hume – Essays Moral and Political vol. ii
Benito Jerónimo Feijoo – Cartas eruditas y curiosas
Colin Maclaurin – Treatise on Fluxions
John Oldmixon – Memoirs of the Press, Historical and Political
Horace Walpole and Sir Charles Hanbury Williams – The Lessons for the Day (satire on William Pulteney, Bolingbroke and the "Patriot Whigs").
William Warburton – A Critical and Philosophical Commentary on Mr. Pope's Essay on Man
John Wesley
The Character of a Methodist
The Principles of a Methodist
George Whitefield – Nine Sermons

Births
January 1 – Isaac Reed, English Shakespearean editor (died 1807)
March 25 – William Combe, English writer, poet and adventurer (died 1823)
June 25 – Johann Schweighäuser, German classical scholar (died 1830)
September 14 – James Wilson, American pamphleteer and publisher (died 1798)
October 6 – Johan Herman Wessel, Norwegian author (died 1785)
unknown dates
Ralph Broome, English pamphleteer (died 1805)
Mihály Bakos (Miháo Bakoš), Slovene hymnist and Lutheran minister in Hungary (died 1803)

Deaths
March 23 – Jean-Baptiste Dubos, French author (born 1670)
April 27 – Nicholas Amhurst, English poet and political writer (born 1697)
July 9 – John Oldmixon, English historian (born 1673)
July 14 – Richard Bentley, English scholar and critic (born 1662)
July 19 – William Somervile, English poet (born 1675)
November 24 – Andrew Bradford, American publisher (born 1686)

References

 
Years of the 18th century in literature